Irina Sandalova (born 17 February 1992) is a Kazakhstani footballer who plays as a goalkeeper for Ukrainian club Voskhod and the Kazakhstan women's national team.

Career
Sandalova has been capped for the Kazakhstan national team, appearing for the team during the 2019 FIFA Women's World Cup qualifying cycle. She is nowadays considered as the second best goalkeeper in her country. She became famous after making 10 saves against France, on 1 December 2020, during Kazakhstan's 12–0 loss. She blocked attempts from some of women's football's biggest names such as Amel Majri.

References

External links
 
 
 

1992 births
Living people
Kazakhstani women's footballers
Kazakhstan women's international footballers
Women's association football goalkeepers